The Dreams of Jinsha is a 2010 animated film released in China. It was directed by Chen Deming and produced by Hangzhou C&L Digital Production. It was China's most expensive animated film ever.

Plot
The plot of this story revolves around the character of Xiao Long, who is whisked back over 3,000 years into the past and ends up in an ancient kingdom known as Jinsha.

Cast and Characters

Accolades
The film was shortlisted for the 2011 Oscar nomination for Best Animated Feature.

References

External links

2010 films
2010 animated films
2010s Mandarin-language films
Chinese animated films
2010 computer-animated films